The Red House Mystery is a whodunnit by A. A. Milne, published in 1922. It was Milne's only mystery novel (except for Four Days Wonder).

Plot introduction
The setting is an English country house, where Mark Ablett has been entertaining a house party consisting of a widow and her marriageable daughter, a retired major, a wilful actress, and Bill Beverley, a young man about town. Mark's long-lost brother Robert, the black sheep of the family, arrives from Australia and shortly thereafter is found dead, shot through the head. Mark Ablett has disappeared, so Tony Gillingham, a stranger who has just arrived to call on his friend Bill, decides to investigate. Gillingham plays Sherlock Holmes to his younger counterpart's Doctor Watson; they progress almost playfully through the novel while the clues mount up and the theories abound.

Literary significance and criticism
The Red House Mystery was immediately popular; Alexander Woollcott called it "one of the three best mystery stories of all time", though Raymond Chandler, in his essay The Simple Art of Murder (1944), criticised Woollcott for that claim, referring to him as, "rather a fast man with a superlative". Chandler wrote of Milne's novel, "It is an agreeable book, light, amusing in the Punch style, written with a deceptive smoothness that is not as easy as it looks [...] Yet, however light in texture the story may be, it is offered as a problem of logic and deduction. If it is not that, it is nothing at all. There is nothing else for it to be. If the situation is false, you cannot even accept it as a light novel, for there is no story for the light novel to be about."

In his introduction to the 1926 UK edition, A. A. Milne said he had "a passion" for detective stories, having "all sorts of curious preferences" about them: though in real life the best detectives and criminals are professionals, Milne demanded that the detective be an unscientific amateur, accompanied by a likable Watson, rubbing shoulders with an amateur villain against whom dossiers and fingerprints are of no avail.

Chandler's essay rejects this model, declaring: "It is the ladies and gentlemen of what Mr. Howard Haycraft (in his book Murder for Pleasure) calls the Golden Age of Detective Fiction that really get me down." He uses The Red House Mystery to illustrate the problems he saw in many mystery stories of this type, particularly the central puzzle (which was intricate and clever but implausible in many ways) and the fact that the amateur detective's chance to shine comes only because the police are incompetent and surprisingly willing to put up with a "brash amateur" romping through their territory. ("English police seem to endure him with their customary stoicism; but I shudder to think of what the boys down at the Homicide Bureau in my city would do to him.")

Chandler noted that The Red House Mystery seemed to have been in print in the US for about 16 years. "That happens to few books of any kind." By 1948, 23 editions had been published in the UK. The most recent UK reprint was the Folio Society illustrated slip-cased edition, published in 2016 with an introduction by award-winning A. A. Milne biographer Ann Thwaite.

Selected Release details
1922, UK, Methuen (ISBN ?), Pub date 6 April 1922, hardback (First edition)
1922, USA, E. P. Dutton (ISBN ?), Pub date ? ? 1922, hardback
1926, UK, Methuen, includes an introduction by A. A. Milne (dated April 1926)
1926 ? UK, The Library Press Ltd. In the Minerva Editions series. Inc: the 1926 introduction.
1937,  UK, Methuen's Modern Classics, Pub date ? March 1937, hardback
1938, UK Odhams Press, hardback as "Four Great Detective Novels"
1938, UK Penguin paperback
1970, USA, E. P. Dutton, Pub date ? May 1970, hardback
1980, USA, Dell Publishing, Pub date ? November 1980, paperback (a Murder Ink(R) Mystery)
1983, UK, Methuen Publishing, Pub date 5 May 1983, hardback
1992, UK, John Curley & Assoc, Pub date ? March 1992, paperback (Large print books)
2000, UK, Dover Publications, Pub date 1 February 2000, paperback
2002, USA, BJU Press, Pub date ? January 2002, paperback
2003, UK, Wildside Press, Pub date ? October 2003, paperback
2005, UK, Dodo Press, Pub date 30 September 2005, paperback
2008, UK, Vintage Classics, Pub date 6 November 2008, hardback
2009, UK, Vintage Classics, Pub date 6 August 2009, paperback.

References

External links
 
 
 
The Simple Art of Murder Dead link

1922 British novels
British mystery novels
Novels by A. A. Milne
Locked-room mysteries
Methuen Publishing books
Works set in country houses